The Cullen–Harrison Act, named for its sponsors, Senator Pat Harrison and Representative Thomas H. Cullen, enacted by the United States Congress on March 21, 1933, and signed by President Franklin D. Roosevelt the following day, legalized the sale in the United States of beer with an alcohol content of 3.2% (by weight) and wine of similarly low alcohol content, thought to be too low to be intoxicating, effective April 7, 1933. Upon signing the legislation, Roosevelt made his famous remark, "I think this would be a good time for a beer."

According to the Cullen–Harrison Act, states had to pass their own similar legislation to legalize sale of the low alcohol beverages within their borders. Roosevelt had previously sent a short message to Congress requesting such a bill. Sale of even low alcohol beer had been illegal in the U.S. since Prohibition started in 1920 following the 1919 passage of the Volstead Act. Throngs gathered outside breweries and taverns to celebrate the return of 3.2 beer. The passage of the Cullen–Harrison Act is celebrated as National Beer Day every year on April 7 in the United States.

See also
Eighteenth Amendment to the United States Constitution
Twenty-first Amendment to the United States Constitution

References

External links
 

Prohibition in the United States
United States federal criminal legislation
1933 in American law
73rd United States Congress